Franz Barsicke (15 May 1905 – 1944) was a German long-distance runner. He competed in the marathon at the 1936 Summer Olympics. He was killed in action during World War II.

References

1905 births
1944 deaths
Athletes (track and field) at the 1936 Summer Olympics
German male long-distance runners
German male marathon runners
Olympic athletes of Germany
Sportspeople from Wrocław
German military personnel killed in World War II